Hansmukh Rathod (born 1953) is an astrologer from Mumbai, India, who was arrested on March 22, 2009, for allegedly raping two girls since they were 12 and 9 years old. He was accompanied by Kishore Chauhan and his wife Anjana Chauhan.  During police investigation he offered to compensate for the crimes by getting the younger sister married to his son.

It was alleged that Rathod had abused other girls too. The investigating police had claimed that Rathod was well connected with local politicians and had high-profile clients.

All three accused were acquitted by Thane Sessions Court on Aug 4, 2011, after the prosecution failed to establish rape.

See also 
Fritzl case, a similar incident in Austria
List of child abuse cases featuring long-term detention

References 

Living people
1945 births
2009 crimes in India
Child sexual abuse in India
People acquitted of rape